Shaun Byrne is the name of:

 Shaun Byrne (footballer, born 1981), English-born footballer who represented the Republic of Ireland
 Shaun Byrne (footballer, born 1993), Scottish footballer (Dunfermline Athletic, Livingston)

See also
Sean Byrne (disambiguation)